This is a list of electoral results for the electoral district of Rainbow in Victorian state elections.

Members for Rainbow

Election results

Elections in the 1950s

Elections in the 1940s

References

Victoria (Australia) state electoral results by district